Armagh City was a United Kingdom Parliament constituency in Ireland.

Boundaries
This constituency was the parliamentary borough of Armagh in County Armagh. It was the successor constituency to the Armagh City constituency of the Parliament of Ireland.

The constituency was disenfranchised in the 1885 redistribution of parliamentary seats and incorporated into the county division of Mid Armagh.

Members of Parliament

Elections

Elections in the 1830s

Elections in the 1840s
Curry resigned after being appointed a Master in Chancery, causing a by-election.

Elections in the 1850s

Moore's death caused a by-election.

Elections in the 1860s

Miller was appointed a judge in bankruptcy, causing a by-election.

Elections in the 1870s

Vance died, causing a by-election.

Elections in the 1880s

References

The Parliaments of England by Henry Stooks Smith (1st edition published in three volumes 1844–50), 2nd edition edited (in one volume) by F.W.S. Craig (Political Reference Publications 1973)

Westminster constituencies in County Armagh (historic)
Constituencies of the Parliament of the United Kingdom established in 1801
Constituencies of the Parliament of the United Kingdom disestablished in 1885
Politics of Armagh (city)
1801 establishments in Ireland
1885 disestablishments in Ireland